Zaramin or Zarramin may refer to:
 Zaramin-e Olya
 Zaramin-e Sofla